Kayavak (born August 3, 1999) is a female beluga whale that currently resides at the Shedd Aquarium in downtown Chicago. She is the only daughter of the mother beluga named Immiayuk.

Early life
Kayavak was born on August 3, 1999 to a beluga named Immiayuk at the Shedd Aquarium in Chicago. She was the third calf born at the aquarium, and the first to survive. As part of a Shedd tradition, she was given an Inuit name. "Kayavak" means "singing game producing soft echoes".

Death of her mother
Immiayuk died suddenly on December 26, 1999. The cause of death was erysipelas, a rare bacterial infection found in the fish that the whales eat. Aquarium staff feared that Kayavak would soon die without her mother. Several options were considered for saving her life. It was decided using an artificial milk formula was not a viable option, as no such formula had been developed yet for belugas (The first such substitute was used for the first time in July 2010 when a beluga calf at SeaWorld San Antonio was rejected by her mother). They also chose not to place her with another adult female beluga, Puiji, who had lost her own calf four months prior. There was doubt she would bond with the calf, or be able to produce milk again. That left weaning her onto fish.

Kayavak needed around-the-clock monitoring and constant attention. Trainers hand-fed her with fish every three hours, although the beluga is not usually weaned for a year.

Later life
As Kayavak grew older, it was decided to introduce her to the aquarium's other belugas. Before her mother's death, she had been housed with other adult females Naya and Mauyak, but had been kept isolated since Immiayuk died. Beginning a year after her mother's death, Kayavak was introduced to Puiji and Naya, spending a few hours at a time with one of them before they would become aggressive towards her. Later on, she was introduced to Mauyak, and her calf Qannik, who was born a year after Kayavak. Kayavak befriended Qannik, but his mother was extremely protective of him and would chase Kayavak away.

When Kayavak was three years old, she was introduced to the entire group of belugas at Shedd. All were initially aggressive towards her, and she was the lowest ranking animal in the pecking order. Eventually, she settled into the group, becoming particularly close with Qannik. The two were separated in 2007 when Qannik was moved to Point Defiance Zoo and Aquarium.

Today, Kayavak lives at the Shedd Aquarium with seven other belugas.

See also
 List of individual cetaceans

References

External links
Shedd Aquarium - website of Kayavak's home aquarium

1999 animal births
Individual beluga whales
Individual animals in the United States